Cantons were administrative units in several autonomous republics and regions of Russian Soviet Federative Socialist Republic, and then the Soviet Union, in 1920–1941. Cantons existed in Bashkir ASSR (1922–1930),
Dagestan ASSR (1928–1929), Kirghiz ASSR (1926–1930), Tatar ASSR (1920–1930), Mariyskaya AO and the Volga German ASSR.

History of the administrative divisions of Russia